Snyfontein is a settlement situated  outside of Keetmanshoop in the ǁKaras Region of Namibia. It has about 1,000 inhabitants and belongs to the electoral constituency of Berseba . The people of this settlement mainly depend on subsistence farming and state welfare.

References

Populated places in the ǁKaras Region